Rudolf Koivu (1890–1946) was a Finnish illustrator and painter, best known for illustrating books of fairytales for children, which are enduringly and timelessly popular. He was born in St. Petersburg. He illustrated stories by Zacharias Topelius, Anni Swan and Hans Christian Andersen, among others. Koivu died in Helsinki in 1946.
In his honor, the Rudolf Koivu Prize was established in 1949. It is awarded biennially to Finnish illustrators of children's books.

References

External links
www.yle.fi
Rudolf Koivu Homepage
The Rudolf Koivu children's book illustration prize
Illustrations by Rudolf Koivu on Flickr
Stamps on CataWiki

Finnish illustrators
Finnish children's book illustrators
20th-century illustrators of fairy tales
Finnish gay artists
1890 births
1946 deaths
20th-century Finnish painters
Finnish male painters
20th-century Finnish LGBT people
20th-century Finnish male artists